Sorbus scannelliana, Scannell's whitebeam, is a species of whitebeam endemic to Ross Island near Killarney in southwest Ireland. It is one of the rarest tree species in the world; only five individual plants are known.

Description
Leaves are elliptic, ranging from 1.6 to 1.85 times as long as they are broad. The upper face of the leaf is a dark, somewhat shiny green, while the underside is light greyish green, this due to the abundance of short, soft hairs. Both the base and apex of the leaf form acute angles, while the margins are lobed, incised 1/7  to 1/4 the way to the midrib. The flowers are white and form a quite dense inflorescence. Very few fruits have been observed, but seem to be more elongated than other whitebeams.

Discovery
The species now known as S. scannelliana, was first critically examined in 1988, when it was believed to be an ecotype of Sorbus anglica. Further investigation led to its being classified as a distinct, new species in 2009.

Naming
The specific epithet, scannelliana, was chosen to honour Irish botanist Maura Scannell, author of, among other works, the Census Catalogue of the Flora of Ireland.

References

scannelliana